Highwood is a North Shore suburb of Chicago in Moraine Township, Lake County, Illinois, United States. As of the 2020 census, the population was 5,074. It is known for its entertainment, restaurants, bars, and festivals.

Geography 

The city is located next to Highland Park and Fort Sheridan, and south of the Fort Sheridan Forest Preserve.

History 

Originally, the land was owned by the Potawatomi until it was ceded to the United States through the 1833 Treaty of Chicago. The first non-Native American settled in the town in 1846. In 1851 Highwood became the headquarter location of the Chicago North Shore and Milwaukee Railroad, which ran parallel to the Chicago and North Western Railway, and is known today as Metra's Union Pacific / North Line. Thomas Curley suggested the name High Woods because the land was the highest ground between Chicago and Milwaukee and was covered with trees.

In 1886 civil and labor unrest in Chicago eventually led to the Haymarket Riot. Chicago businessmen felt that having a military presence near the city would help alleviate tensions within the city and on November 8, 1887 purchased Camp Highwood. This land would come to host members of the Sixth Infantry Regiment. On February 27, 1888 Camp Highwood was officially named Fort Sheridan in honor of General Philip Sheridan for his ability to maintain order after the Chicago Fire of 1871. 

Highwood provided several business and employment opportunities and following the fire, many of those who lost their home and a wave of immigrants settled into the town. Highwood can also give credit to much of their economic success to the Chicago and Milwaukee Electric Railway. However, with increased transportation it also caused a sudden rise in gambling dens and illegal "blind-pig" taverns which catered to off duty soldiers. This eventually provoked federal authorities to enact the "Highwood Quadrangle" which prohibited the sale of liquor within 1 1/8th miles of the army base.

Fort Sheridan acted as an entertainment center for the town and on July 18, 1888 the trustees voted to change the name from Highwood to the Village of Fort Sheridan to capitalize on its military glamour. However, 8 years later in 1894 the name was changed back to Highwood due to resident frustration and confusion with postal misrouting. The city's business district became filled with bars and taverns which led Theodore Roosevelt to call the city "one of the toughest towns in America".

In the 1920s a large number of Northern Italian immigrants (originally from Modena) moved to Highwood, many from Dalzell, Illinois, a coal mining town in Bureau County, to seek jobs. The national prohibition of alcohol at the time also attracted bootleggers who smuggled large quantities of liquor into the city. The fight to prevent Highwood from being known as a whisky den largely brought the community together.

Following the start of World War II Fort Sheridan was used as an active training ground. By the end of the war Highwood had experienced another wave of immigration, this time a majority of immigrants coming from Europe and Mexico. Since then Highwood's business have continued to flourish and the city has become the destination for North Shore dining and nightlife. The city frequently hosts festivals for residents known as Celebrate Highwood which is hosted by the city chambers.

Government 
Highwood operates an council-manager government.

Transportation 

The main highway to Highwood is U.S. Route 41, which connects Chicago to Milwaukee. Commuter rail is available at two different Metra stations locations within the city (Fort Sheridan and Highwood). Highwood is also located near the Highland Park and Lake Forest stations which all located on the Union Pacific / North Line which begins in Kenosha and ends in the downtown area of Chicago at Ogilvie Transportation Center.

Schools
Highwood residents are served by North Shore School District 112 and Township High School District 113. The majority of Highwood's children attend Oak Terrace School for Kindergarten through fifth grade, Northwood Junior High School for sixth through eighth grade, and Highland Park High School for grades nine through twelve.

St. James School was a private Catholic school located in Highwood, but closed in 2015 due to a lack of funding and low enrollment.

Recreation 

The Don Skrinar Recreation Center is a public recreation facility located near downtown Highwood. The city is also a host to the Midwest Young Artists Conservatory and The Performer's School. The Fine Art Studio of ROTBLATT-AMRANY which is owned by Julie Rotblatt Amrany is located within the old village of Fort Sheridan.

Demographics

2020 census

Note: the US Census treats Hispanic/Latino as an ethnic category. This table excludes Latinos from the racial categories and assigns them to a separate category. Hispanics/Latinos can be of any race.

2010 census 
At the 2010 census, Highwood's resident population was 5,405. The median resident age was 32.8.

The racial makeup of the city was 69.64% White (38.5% Non-Hispanic White), 1.54% Black or African American, 2.24% Asian, 0.31% Native American, 0.02% Pacific Islander, 22.92% of some other race and 3.33% of two or more races. 56.87% were Hispanic or Latino (of any race).

2000 census 
At the 2000 census there were 4,143 people in 1,555 households, including 933 families, in the city. The racial makeup of the city was 43.14% White, 2.15% African American, 0.58% Native American, 2.12% Asian, 0.05% Pacific Islander, 17.19% from other races, and 4.78% from two or more races. Hispanic or Latino of any race were 38.23%.

Of the 1,555 households 29.8% had children under the age of 18 living with them, 43.2% were married couples living together, 10.0% had a female householder with no husband present, and 40.0% were non-families. 34.1% of households were one person and 13.0% were one person aged 65 or older. The average household size was 2.60 and the average family size was 3.31.

The age distribution was 23.3% under the age of 18, 10.6% from 18 to 24, 33.8% from 25 to 44, 16.6% from 45 to 64, and 15.7% 65 or older. The median age was 34 years. For every 100 females, there were 99.1 males. For every 100 females age 18 and over, there were 98.0 males.

The median household income was $42,993 and the median family income was $53,000. Males had a median income of $30,560 versus $27,560 for females. The per capita income for the city was $24,138. These income statistics are significantly lower than in surrounding towns. About 4.3% of families and 7.0% of the population were below the poverty line, including 9.9% of those under age 18 and 5.2% of those age 65 or over.

Architecture 
Highwood was settled in 1887 and was largely developed before the post-World War II building boom that led to much of the suburban development that characterizes Lake County. Therefore, the city has a large collection of pre-war residential and commercial structures that reflect the architecture popular during that period, including neo-classical, Italianate, and arts and crafts bungalow styles. Also common in the business district are brick commercial "store front" structures with commercial businesses on the ground floor and residential apartments above.

Notable people 

 Frank Bernardi, National Football League defensive back (1955–1960)
 Scott Drury, member of the Illinois House of Representatives (2013–2019)
 Lowell B. Komie, lawyer and writer
 Francis Joseph Magner, prelate of Catholic church; served as Bishop of Marquette (1941–1947)
  Settimio Fernando "Terry" Terracina , Light Heavy-Weight Boxing Champion of Italy 1936 to 1939. Owner of The Rainbow (1949 to 1968) and La Lira(1968 to 1974)  Born in Rome: January 11, 1917 Died February 10,1985, Buried at Shalom Memorial Park.

References

External links 
 City of Highwood
 Highwood Chamber of Commerce
 Highwood Historical Society

 
Chicago metropolitan area
Cities in Lake County, Illinois
Populated places established in 1887
Cities in Illinois
Illinois populated places on Lake Michigan
Majority-minority cities and towns in Lake County, Illinois